Joseph Gill may refer to:
 Joseph A. Gill (1854–1933), U. S. District Judge in Indian Territory from 1899 until 1907
 Joseph B. Gill (1862–1942), Lieutenant Governor of Illinois
 Joseph J. Gill (1846–1920), U.S. Representative from Ohio
 Joseph K. Gill (1841–1931), American retailer and publisher in Oregon
 Joseph L. Gill (1885–1972), American Democratic Party politician from Chicago, Illinois